Darrell Thomas Robertson (born April 15, 1986) is a former American football linebacker. He was signed by the Dallas Cowboys as an undrafted free agent in 2008. He played college football at Georgia Tech.

Robertson was also a member of the Edmonton Eskimos, New England Patriots and Kansas City Chiefs.

Professional career

Dallas Cowboys
Robertson was signed by the Dallas Cowboys as an undrafted free agent on April 29, 2008. He was waived by the team on August 30 during final cuts.

Edmonton Eskimos
Robertson was signed to the CFL's Edmonton Eskimos' practice roster on September 10, 2008. He was then signed to the active roster on September 17. He was released by the team on September 29.

New England Patriots
Robertson was signed to the practice squad of the New England Patriots on November 17, 2008 when tight end Tyson DeVree was promoted to the active roster. He was waived by the team on February 27, 2009.

Kansas City Chiefs
Robertson was signed by the Kansas City Chiefs on March 6, 2009. He was waived on June 19, 2009.

External links

Dallas Cowboys bio
Georgia Tech Yellow Jackets bio 
Kansas City Chiefs bio
New England Patriots bio

1986 births
Living people
People from Jonesboro, Georgia
Sportspeople from the Atlanta metropolitan area
Players of American football from Georgia (U.S. state)
American football defensive ends
American football linebackers
Georgia Tech Yellow Jackets football players
Dallas Cowboys players
New England Patriots players
Kansas City Chiefs players
Las Vegas Locomotives players
American players of Canadian football
Canadian football defensive linemen
Edmonton Elks players